The Wellington Sculpture Trust is an independent charitable trust which funds and advocates for public sculptures in Wellington, New Zealand. It is funded by private and corporate donations and works with the Wellington City Council. It has commissioned and bought sculptures sited in the Botanic Garden, Cobham Drive at the head of Evans Bay in Rongotai, the Wellington waterfront and Lambton Quay in the central city.

History 

In 1982 funds were needed to install Albatross a statue on the waterfront by Tanya Ashken. The Wellington City Council had agreed to a site on the waterfront but funding for the sculpture had to be found. After the initial fundraising for Albatross Henry Lang and Dr Ian Prior formed the Trust in 1983 to advocate for public sculptures and provide financial support. During the demolition and rebuilding which occurred in Wellington city in the 1980s the Trust saw that public sculptures would enhance cultural and spiritual values as the city was redeveloped.

The Trust is funded by private citizens, businesses and other bodies. It works in partnership with the Wellington City Council. It has had a partnership with Meridian Energy to create the Meridian Energy Wellington Wind Sculptures on Cobham Drive and the Griffin Charitable Trust for the Lambton Quay works.

In 2002–2003 the Trust organised a Lambton Quay Sculpture Competition which resulted in several sculptures in the city centre: Spinning Top by Robert Jahnke, Invisible City by Anton Parsons, Shells by Jeff Thomson and Protoplasm by Phil Price.

In 2007 Neil Plimmer, the Trust's chair, wrote that the Trust had commissioned 19 public sculptures since 1982. By 2023 the Trust had installed 30 sculptures.

Neil Plimmer was chairperson from 2001 to 2013 and Sue Elliott became chair in 2013.

Since 2014 the Trust has organised PARK(ing) Day, an annual event in which parking spaces in Cuba Street have been taken over by a variety of artists and others to examine how public spaces are used.

Selected sculptures

Botanic Garden 
 Inner Form, also known as Bronze Form (1986) by Henry Moore – purchased after Moore died, one of only a few works offered by his estate. Originally in Midland Park in Lambton Quay it was moved in 1995 to the lawn on Salamanca Road in the Botanic Garden.
 Peacemaker (1991) by Chris Booth – a stack of boulders with water streaming down.
 Listening and Viewing Device (1993) by Andrew Drummond – a six metre copper coil shaped like a funnel.
 Body to Soul (1996) by Mary–Louise Browne – words written on plaques form a staircase. The words change as the staircase rises changing from 'body' at the bottom to 'soul' at the top.
 Rudderstone (1997) by Denis O'Connor – a doorway in the shape of a rudder.

Wind sculpture walk, Cobham Drive 

Five kinetic sculptures make up the Wind Sculpture Walk on Cobham Drive. The sculptures were designed to take advantage of the windy location.
 Pacific Grass (2001) by Kon Dimopoulos
 Zephyrometer (2003) by Phil Price
 Tower of Light (2004) by Andrew Drummond
 Urban Forest (2007) by Leon van den Eijkel
 Akau Tangi (2010) by Philip Dadson

Central city 
 Albatross (1986) by Tanya Ashken – in Frank Kitts Park.
 Ferns (1998) by Neil Dawson – a globe of ferns suspended over Civic Square. The sculpture was replaced in 2018 after the original was found to have structural weaknesses.
 Kaiwhakatere – the Navigator (2000) by Brett Graham – in Bowen Street. Sited opposite the Treasury where Henry Lang was Secretary from 1968 to 1977 it was commissioned to pay tribute to Lang's vision. Three granite blocks represent a bird's head, an altar and a waka acknowledging Polynesian navigation.
 Spinning Top (2002) by Robert Jahnke – a spinning top in Woodward St which represents both Māori and European history and the astrological calendar.
 Shells (2002) by Jeff Thomson – five painted concrete shells on the corner of Waring Taylor St and Lambton Quay.
 Protoplasm (2002) by Phil Price – a moving structure of green pebbles on the corner of Hunter St and Lambton Quay.
 Invisible City (2003) by Anton Parsons – steel blocks with Braille symbols on the corner of Grey St and Lambton Quay.
 Water Whirler (2006) by Len Lye – on the Wellington waterfront.
 Woman of Words (2013) by Virginia King – statue of author Katherine Mansfield in Midland Park on the corner of Waring Taylor St and Lambton Quay
 Walk the Line (2015) by Joe Sheehan – a line of 231 discs of pounamu and jade which trace the line of the Waipori Stream down Bowen St to the foreshore
 The Grove (2022) by Glen Hayward  – on the Wellington waterfront.

Gallery

References

External links 
 Wellington Sculpture Trust website

1983 establishments in New Zealand
Outdoor sculptures in New Zealand
Buildings and structures in Wellington City